John Dodington (c. 1522 – 1585) of Westminster, was an English Member of Parliament. He represented Westminster in 1572. Offices held include clerk of the engrossment of pay books, comptroller of the pipe c. 1566; and burgess of Westminster 1585.

References

1520s births
1585 deaths
People from Westminster
English MPs 1572–1583